Australian diplomatic missions are posts representing the Commonwealth of Australia in foreign countries. They are mostly maintained by the Department of Foreign Affairs and Trade, with some smaller posts being run by Austrade. There are currently over 100 Australian missions overseas.

As Australia is a Commonwealth country, its diplomatic missions in the capitals of other Commonwealth countries are referred to as High Commissions (as opposed to embassies).

Under the terms of the Canada–Australia Consular Services Sharing Agreement, the two countries provide consular services to each other's citizens at a number of locations around the world. At this time, there are 12 cities where Canadians can obtain consular services from Australian offices, and 19 locations where Canadian offices provide consular services to Australians. In an emergency, Australians can also seek assistance from British diplomatic missions around the world in the absence of an Australian consulate or embassy.

Honorary consulates are excluded from this listing.

History 

After federation in 1901, Australia's presence abroad was largely limited to state and Commonwealth agents and trade offices. The United Kingdom played a defining role in Australia's foreign policy, limiting its need for missions abroad.  In 1939 there were only two External Affairs officers posted overseas: one in London (known as Australia House), and one in Washington attached to the British Embassy.

The Second World War necessitated increased co-operation with foreign countries independent of the UK Foreign and Commonwealth Office. By 1940, a base of four missions had been established in Washington, Ottawa, London, and Tokyo, and as World War II progressed missions to Australia's wartime allies were established in Nouméa, Chongqing, and Moscow.

Australian diplomatic missions today number at over 100, although the number of Australian diplomats overseas has dramatically been reduced. Missions have been closed in Almaty, Damascus, Kupang, Lusaka, Algiers, Cape Town, Dar es Salaam, and Bridgetown.

Current missions

Africa

Americas

Asia

Europe

Oceania

Multilateral organisations

Gallery

Closed missions

Africa

Americas

Asia

Europe

See also

 Department of Foreign Affairs and Trade
 Foreign relations of Australia
 Visa policy of Australia

Notes

References

External links

 Department of Foreign Affairs and Trade
 Australian embassies, consulates and missions around the world

 
Australia
Diplomatic missions
Department of Foreign Affairs and Trade (Australia)